Alison Lever (born 13 October 1972) is an Australian former athlete. She competed in the women's discus throw at the 2000 Summer Olympics.

References

External links
 

1972 births
Living people
Athletes (track and field) at the 2000 Summer Olympics
Australian female discus throwers
Olympic athletes of Australia
Commonwealth Games medallists in athletics
Athletes (track and field) at the 1998 Commonwealth Games
Commonwealth Games bronze medallists for Australia
Sportspeople from Manchester
20th-century Australian women
Medallists at the 1998 Commonwealth Games